Colegio del Bosque México is a private school in Bosques de las Lomas, Cuajimalpa, Mexico City, affiliated with the Legion of Christ. It enrolls girls from preschool to the 12th grade.

Boys and girls are educated in separate classes.

In 1975 a board of trustees founded the school. Manuel Senderos donated the land and Héctor Mestre Martínez served as the architect.

References

External links
 Colegio del Bosque México
  Colegio del Bosque México

High schools in Mexico City
Cuajimalpa
Private schools in Mexico
1975 establishments in Mexico
Educational institutions established in 1975